Hyderabadi cuisine (native: Hyderabadi Ghizaayat), also known as Deccani cuisine, is the native cooking style of the Hyderabad, Telangana, India. The haute cuisine of Hyderabad began to develop after the foundation of the Bahmani Sultanate, and the Qutb Shahi dynasty centered in the city of Hyderabad promoted the native cuisine along with their own. Hyderabadi cuisine had become a princely legacy of the Nizams of Hyderabad as it began to further develop under their patronage.

The Hyderabadi cuisine is an amalgamation of South Asian, Mughalai, Turkic, and Arabic along with the influence of local Telangana and Marathwada cuisines. Hyderabadi cuisine comprises a broad repertoire of rice, wheat, and meat dishes and the skilled use of various spices, herbs and natural edibles.

Hyderabadi cuisine has different recipes for different events, and hence is categorized accordingly, from banquet food, to weddings and parties, festival foods, and travel foods. The category to which the recipe belongs itself speaks of different things like the time required to prepare the food, the shelf life of the prepared item, etc.

History

Medieval period
The Deccan region is an inland area in India. The native cuisine was prominent until the Vijayanagara Empire lasted, it was during the rule of Delhi Sultanate, Muhammad bin Tughluq when he shifted the capital from Delhi to Daulatabad, the Deccan region adopted the foreign cuisines. In the 14th century when the Bahmani Sultanate was formed by revolting against the Delhi Sultanate in Deccan, the Turkish noblemen were appointed in the high positions, and introduced the Turkish cuisine.

The two-centuries-long political instability in the region of the Deccan and the main Central Mughal authority and migration has introduced Deccan with multiple foreign cuisines.

In Deccan medieval cuisine, banquets were common among the aristocracy. Multiple courses would be prepared and served in a style called Dastarkhān (A long cloth laid on the floor on which food dishes and dinners plates are placed). Food was generally eaten by hand, served on among commons and nobility. The food was mostly meat oriented being grilled and fried in tandoor. The curry were highly seasoned and flavored by using spices. Fruits were preferred rather than dessert after main course. Once the meals are ended Kahwa (liquid hot drink) was consumed that contains ingredients to digest food. The ingredients of the cuisine varied greatly according to the seasons and festivals, and many items were preserved in the form of Pickles.

Modern period
The modern cuisine was evolved during the Nizams in the mid-17th century, and elevated to a sublime art form. Hyderabad has a history of continuous influx of migrants from all over the world and in general from the Indian sub-continent, particularly since 1857. Most of the foreign food had been improved to suit the culinary preferences, resulting to form the unique derivative cuisine that excels over the original. Biryani and Haleem (Arabic) for instance is prepared all over India, but the Hyderabadi variety is ultimately from the Hyderabadi Biryani and Hyderabadi Haleem. Til ke chatuni with Arabic tahini, Persian dried lamb with beans is modified with dalcha, tandoori naan of Uzbek (Central Asia) to create Sheermal. Most of the modern day desserts in Hyderabadi cuisine were introduced and invented during the times of Nizams, today that had become an integral part of cuisine.

Hyderabadi cuisine is an integral part of the cuisines of the former Hyderabad State that includes the state of Telangana and the regions of Marathwada (now in Maharashtra) and Kalyana-Karanataka (now in Karnataka). The Hyderabadi cuisine contains city-specific specialties like Hyderabad (Hyderabadi biryani and Hyderabadi Haleem) and Aurangabad (Naan Qalia), Parbhani (Biryani and Tahari), Bidar (Kalyani Biryani) and others. The use of dry coconut, tamarind, and red chillies along with other spices are the main ingredients that make Hyderabadi cuisine different from the North Indian cuisine.

Course

Hyderabadi dinner also known as Dastarkhwan are usually of five course meal; Aghaz (Soup), Mezban (appetizers), Waqfa (Sorbet), Mashgool Dastarkhwan (Main course) and Zauq-e-shahi (dessert).

Starters

Lukhmi
Lukhmi is a regional non-vegetarian variation of the samosa, though it is shaped into a flat square patty. It is made from flour and stuffed with minced mutton or beef, known as kheema. It is eaten as an evening snack or served as a starter at celebrations.

Murtabak
Murtabak is often described as spicy folded omelette pancake with bits of vegetables. It is the most common form of Murtabak; which is egg-filled pancake, sometimes mixed with green onion and minced meat, made from pan fried crepes which is folded and cut to squares.

Hyderabadi Haleem

Hyderabadi Haleem is a popular dish of Hyderabad. It is a stew composed of mutton, lentils, spices and wheat. It originates from Harees, an Arab dish brought to Hyderabad by Arab migrants. Harees is still prepared in its original form in Barkas. It is sometimes served as a starter at celebrations, but it is usually only prepared during the month of Ramadan for the Iftar meal.

Biryani

Hyderabadi Biryani is one of the most popular dishes of the city. It is distinctly different from other variations of the Biryani, originating from the kitchens of the Nizams of Hyderabad. It is a celebration dish of basmati rice and mutton, along with yoghurt, onions and various spices. It is a key dish to the cuisine and it is said that the dish is considered synonymous with the city of Hyderabad.

Variants
 Kalyani Biryani is a variant of the Hyderabadi Biryani using beef instead of lamb or mutton. This meal was started after Kalyani Nawabs of Bidar came to Hyderabad sometime in the 18th century. The Kalyani biryani is made with small cubes of beef, regular spices, onions and many tomatoes. It has a distinct tomato, jeera (cumin), dhania (coriander) flavour.

 Tahari, made by the  Hyderabadi Muslims is a rice and meat dish. Unlike biryani in which rice is precooked and then layered with meat, rice in tahari is cooked in meat. Occasionally vegetables, more commonly potatoes, are also added. It is served with dahi ki chutney.

Other dishes

Pathar-ka-Gosht 
Pathar ka Gosht is a mutton kebab. It is named for the traditional method of preparation, on a stone slab. (Pathar means stone in Urdu as well Hindi)

Hyderabadi Khichdi
The Hyderabadi version of the popular dish Khichdi is distinct from the many variants enjoyed all across India. It is eaten with Kheema (minced mutton curry). It is consumed as a breakfast item, as well as during the month of Ramadan for the Sehri meal.

Talawa Gosht 
Tala hua Gosht, or Talawa Gosht (in Hyderabadi dialect) is a simple mutton or beef dish usually accompanied by Khatti Dal. It may be eaten with Roti or rice.

Desserts

 
 Qubani ka meetha (Khubani-ka-Meetha) - Apricot Pudding, Toppings with almond and cream. The original recipe is a translucent liquid.
 Double ka meetha- Bread Pudding topped with dry fruits, a derivative of mughlai dessert Shahi tukre.
 Sheer korma - Vermicelli pudding and celebratory dessert, specially made on the Ramzan (EId Ul Fitr) day.
 Firni - A Rice dessert.
 Gil-e-Firdaus - A variant of Kheer made of bottle gourd. The name literally translates into "the clay of paradise".
 Faluda - A dessert made of shredded vermicelli noodles with rose syrup and milk. 
 Aab ka shola (Aab shola) - Typical Hyderabadi summer sharbat.
 Hyderabadi Irani tea available at Irani cafes, served with Osmania Biscuits.

Breads

 Naan 
 Sheermal

Images

References

Further reading

 A Princely Legacy, Hyderabadi Cuisine By Pratibha Karan ,  
 Elegant East Indian and Hyderabadi Cuisine By Asema Moosavi, Moosavi, Asema 
 The Essential Andhra Cookbook with Hyderabadi & Telengna Specialities by Bilkees I Latif
 101 Easy to Cook Hyderabadi Recipes By Devi, Geeta 
 Food of India By Priya Wickramasinghe, Carol Selva Rajah
 You Are Where You Eat: Stories and Recipes from the Neighborhoods of New Orleans, By Elsa Hahne Page 47-50
 The Jewels of Nizam: Recipes from the Khansamas of Hyderabad By Geeta Devi, 2014, 
 Aromas from a royal kitchen, 18 June 2019, The Deccan Herald

External links

 Biryani, Haleem & more on Hyderabad's menu: An article published by Times of India

Indian cuisine
 
Biryani, Hyderabad
Mughlai cuisine
Telangana cuisine
Indian cuisine by state or union territory
Indian cuisine by region
Indian cuisine by city